Barak (Hebrew: בָּרָק, bārāq, "lightning"), is a masculine name of Hebrew origin. It appears in the biblical Book of Judges as the name of the Israelite general Barak, who alongside Deborah led an attack against the forces of King Jabin of Hazor.

Etymology
The Semitic root B-R-Q has the meaning "to shine"; "lightning".
The biblical name   is given after Barak, a military commander who appears in the Book of Judges.

The epithet Barcas of the Punic general Hamilcar is derived from the same root, as is the name of Al-Buraq, the miraculous steed of Islamic Mi'raj tradition.

Although the given name is mostly Jewish and found predominantly in Israel, it has occasionally been used by Anglo-Saxon Protestants in the early modern period, when given names from the Hebrew Bible were in fashion, as in the name of Barak Longmate, an 18th-century English genealogist.

Use as a given name
 Barak Norman (c.1670–c.1740), English musical instrument maker
 Barak Longmate (1738–1793), English genealogist and engraver
 Barak Lufan (1987–2022), Israeli kayaker
 Barak Sopé (born 1955), Vanuatu politician
 Barak Badash (born 1982), Israeli football player
 Barak Yitzhaki (born 1984), Israeli football player
 Barak Bakhar (born 1979), Israeli football player
 Barak Eilam, Israeli businessman
 Barak Moshe (born 1991), Israeli football player
 Barak Sultan (1731–1750), member of the Kazakh Khanate dynasty

Use as a surname
 Aharon Barak (born 1936), Israeli former President of the Supreme Court of Israel
 Ehud Barak (born 1942), Israeli former prime minister
 Valia Barak (born 1969), Peruvian journalist and television presenter
 Keren Barak (born 1972), Israeli lobbyist and politician
 Boaz Barak (born 1974), Israeli-American computer scientist

See also
 Barack (disambiguation)
 Barak (surname)
 Barak (disambiguation)
 Burak (disambiguation)
 Barakah
 Baraka (disambiguation)
 Baruch (given name)
 Barcas
 Mubarak (name)

References 

Hebrew masculine given names
Given names
Surnames
Jewish given names
Masculine given names